Gentile (Gerry) Tondino  (September 3, 1923 – August 29, 2001) was a Canadian educator and artist, who lived in Montreal, Quebec. He painted in oil figures, semi-abstracts and still-life.

Life and work
Tondino apprenticed with the Canadian painter Adam Sherriff Scott between 1943 and 1947, and studied for three years at the Montreal Museum of Fine Arts School of Art and Design with Arthur Lismer.

His drawings and paintings have been exhibited widely, in galleries and museums across Canada and Australia, as well as in Belgium and Bermuda. His work is also included in numerous private collections, and in the collections of the Montreal Museum of Fine Arts and the National Gallery of Canada, corporations like Shell Canada, C.I.L., Reader's Digest, the Art Gallery of Ottawa, the Ontario Heritage Foundation, and McGill University, which has nine commissioned portraits. In 1955, he was elected to the Canadian Group of Painters; in 1962, he was elected an associate member of the Royal Canadian Academy of Arts, and in 1968, he was named a full Academician of that society.

Teaching
He was called an inspirational teacher of art and design by students. 
 1959–1999 – McGill University
 1952–1967 – Montreal Museum of Fine Arts School of Art and Design

Awards
 University of McGill Faculty of Engineering Alumni Award for Outstanding Teaching (1997)

See also
 Max Stern

References

1923 births
2001 deaths
20th-century Canadian painters
Canadian male painters
Artists from Montreal
Members of the Royal Canadian Academy of Arts
Canadian abstract artists
20th-century Canadian male artists